Abengourou Airport  is an airport serving Abengourou, Côte d'Ivoire.

See also
Transport in Côte d'Ivoire

References

 OurAirports - Abengourou
  Great Circle Mapper - Abengourou
 Google Earth

Airports in Ivory Coast
Airport
Buildings and structures in Comoé District